Samith Dushantha (born 30 November 1984) is a Sri Lankan cricketer. He made his first-class debut for Saracens Sports Club in the 2006–07 Premier Trophy on 10 November 2006.

In April 2018, he was named in Colombo's squad for the 2018 Super Provincial One Day Tournament.

References

External links
 

1984 births
Living people
Sri Lankan cricketers
Saracens Sports Club cricketers
Vauniya District cricketers
People from Western Province, Sri Lanka